Dropped Frames is a multi-album project by American musician Mike Shinoda, currently consisting of three volumes. Dropped Frames, Vol. 1 was released on July 10, 2020, with subsequent volumes following on July 31 and September 18 of the same year. The project was composed interactively with fans on Shinoda's Twitch channel. All three albums were distributed via Kenji Kobayashi Productions, Shinoda's own company capitally related to Machine Shop co. With the exception of the opening track of volume 1, "Open Door", tracks on Dropped Frames are primarily instrumental.

Background 
When the COVID-19 quarantine began, Shinoda became enamored with Twitch. The singer spent Monday through Friday making art on Twitch while fans gave feedback. Four days of every week involved making music, while one day per week was dedicated to creating visual art.

In late June 2020, Shinoda announced that he planned to publish his second studio album in early July 2020. He also stated that the songs were made with the assistance of fans who viewed his Twitch channel. At that time, he also allowed free streaming of songs "Open Door", "Super Galaxtica" and "Osiris". The song "Open Door" has vocals from Shinoda and over half a dozen fans worldwide. The remainder of the album is entirely instrumental with multiple genres represented.

Critical reception 
Kelsey Chapman of Alternative Press describes Dropped Frames, Vol. 1 as "an abnormally relaxed and joyful record to come out during a time marred by shared social tension and fear".

Brenton Blanchet of Spin characterized Dropped Frames, Vol. 1 as "a mesh of 'Mariachi,' 'Bollywood hip-hop' and '90's boy band pop' suggestions, featuring flute loops, Nintendo Game Boy-driven chords and vocal chants made up of hundreds of fan submissions".

Track listing

Personnel 
 Mike Shinoda – instrumentation, engineer, mastering, producer, vocals
 Ai Mori – vocals
 Debbie Darroch – vocals
 Jessy Boray – vocals
 Joar Westerlund – vocals
 Pershard Owens – vocals
 Sage Douglas – vocals
 Slava – vocals
 Dan Mayo – drums (track 7, vol 1 and track 10, vol 2)

References 

2020 albums
Mike Shinoda albums
Albums produced by Mike Shinoda